Princess Dibyasambanna (Née Her Serene Highness Princess (Mom Chao) Dibyasambanna Bhanubandh ; ; 17 May 1885 - 26 July 1908) was a Princess of Siam (later Thailand). She was a member of Siamese royal family, specifically the Bhanubandh family, as a daughter of Prince Bhanurangsi Savangwongse and Mom Liam.

Biography 
Princess Dibyasambanna is the eldest child of Prince Bhanurangsi Savangwongse and Mom Liam, the princess born at Buraphaphirom Palace On 7 July 1885. As for the name, Dibyasambanna Bhanubandh was bestowed by King Chulalongkorn. As well as being close to King Chulalongkorn since childhood, Princess Dibyasambanna was married to Abhakara Kiartivongse, Prince of Chumphon on February 28, 1900. They had three sons: Prince Kiat Abhakara (Born and died on the same day), Prince Aditya Dibabha and Prince Rangsiyakorn Abhakara.

While Prince Rangsiyakorn Abhakara, the youngest son, had only 1 year old, an unexpected incident occurred when Princess Dibyasambanna died of poison on July 26, 1908. The royal fire ceremony began on 2 February 1908, which has dug a burial ground to be sent to cremate the cremation at the crematorium of Wat Debsirindrawas Ratchaworawiharn. The cremation ceremony was held on 3 February, with King Chulalongkorn become the president of the ceremony.

References 

1885 births
1908 deaths
Suicides by poison
Suicides in Thailand
19th-century Thai women
20th-century Thai women
19th-century Chakri dynasty
20th-century Chakri dynasty
Thai female Phra Ong Chao
People from Bangkok
Bhanubandh family
Thai female Mom Chao
Thai princesses consort